Live in Las Vegas is a live album by American R&B-soul singer-songwriter Macy Gray. The album was recorded at the House of Blues in Las Vegas, Nevada, in 2004 and released on DVD and CD in 2005.

Critical reception 
Live in Las Vegas received generally negative reviews from music critics. In his 2-star review for Allmusic, Andy Kellman the album is criticized for its "sloppiness," though it is noted that "the images will be there to distract you from the faults of the performance."

Track listing

Disc one
"Sex-O-Matic Venus Freak" – 7:18
"When I See You" – 3:52 - credited as "When I See You Again"
"Relating to a Psychopath" – 3:49
"Don't Come Around" – 2:55
"Caligula" – 7:42
"Why Didn't You Call Me" – 3:42
"Things That Made Me Change" – 6:36
"Hey Young World Part 2" – 5:05
"I've Committed Murder" – 5:30
"Do Something" – 3:45

Disc two
"Demons" – 5:51
"Sexual Revolution" – 5:59
"Oblivion" – 3:50
"I Try" – 8:14
"Sweet Baby" – 5:22
"She Ain't Right for You" – 4:38
"I Can't Wait to Meetchu" – 4:13
"The Letter" – 6:55

References

Macy Gray albums
2005 live albums
Albums recorded at the House of Blues
Albums recorded at the House of Blues (Las Vegas)
Mandalay Bay